Dahlewitz is a railway station in the town of Dahlewitz, Brandenburg, Germany. The station lies on the Berlin–Dresden railway and the train services are operated by Deutsche Bahn.

Train services
The station is served by the following services:

Regional services  Berlin –   –Dahlewitz – Wünsdorf-Waldstadt – Luckau-Uckro – Doberlug-Kirchhain – Elsterwerda
Regional services   BER Airport - Terminal 1-2 – Dahlewitz –Wünsdorf-Waldstadt

References

External links
Deutsche Bahn website 

Railway stations in Brandenburg
Buildings and structures in Teltow-Fläming
Railway stations in Germany opened in 1884